Hamza Radwan Kheir (born 28 June 1993) is a Lebanese professional footballer who plays as a defender for  club Shabab Sahel, on loan from Ahed.

Career

Salam Zgharta
Kheir began his Lebanese Premier League career at Salam Zgharta in 2014, becoming the team's captain and playing 79 league games in six years.

Churchill Brothers
On 15 November 2020, Kheir joined I-League club Churchill Brothers on a one-year contract. He made his debut on 10 January 2021, in a 5–2 away win over Indian Arrows. On 19 January, Kheir assisted the lone goal of the game, helping his side win 1–0 away from home to Punjab; he was named man of the match.

Kheir played 12 league games, helping his side finish runners-up in the league; he was nominated Best Defender of the 2020–21 season.

Ahed
Kheir returned to Lebanon on 13 June 2021, signing for Ahed in the Lebanese Premier League.

Sreenidi Deccan
On 31 December 2021, Kheir moved back to India ahead of the 2021–22 I-League, signing for Sreenidi Deccan, one of the new I-League entrants. He made his debut for the club, on 3 March 2022, against TRAU in a 3–1 win. Having played 13 games, Kheir helped his side finish their maiden league campaign in third place.

Honours
Churchill Brothers
 I-League runner-up: 2020–21

Ahed
 Lebanese Premier League: 2021–22
 Lebanese Elite Cup: 2022; runner-up: 2021

Individual
 I-League Best Defender: 2020–21

References

External links

 
  (2014–2015; 2021–present)
  (2015–2021)
 

1993 births
Living people
People from North Governorate
Lebanese footballers
Association football central defenders
Salam Zgharta FC players
Churchill Brothers FC Goa players
Al Ahed FC players
Sreenidi Deccan FC players
Shabab Al Sahel FC players
Lebanese Premier League players
I-League players
Lebanese expatriate footballers
Lebanese expatriate sportspeople in India
Expatriate footballers in India